The list of ship decommissionings in 1966 includes a chronological list of all ships decommissioned in 1966.


See also 

1996
 
Ship